Walter Clyde Curry (1887 - October 2, 1967) was an American academic, medievalist, and poet. He was a member of the Fugitives and the author of four books.

Early life
Walter Clyde Curry was born in 1887 in Gray Court, South Carolina. He graduated from Wofford College, and he earned a master's degree and PhD from Stanford University.

Career
Curry joined the English department at Vanderbilt University in 1915. A poet, he became a member of the Fugitives under the penname of Marpha in the 1920s. He taught at Peabody College from 1930 to 1941. He was the chair of the English department at Vanderbilt University from 1941 to 1955.  On his retirements, his former students, including Cleanth Brooks, published a volume of essays about Curry's scholarship.

Curry was a medievalist, and a member of the Medieval Academy of America. He was also a member of the Modern Language Association.

Personal life and death
Curry married Kathryn Worth in 1927. They had a daughter, who married Joseph Rainey. He died on October 2, 1967, in Nashville, at the age of 80.

Selected works

Further reading

References

1887 births
1967 deaths
People from Gray Court, South Carolina
People from Nashville, Tennessee
Wofford College alumni
Stanford University alumni
Vanderbilt University faculty
American medievalists
Poets from Tennessee
American male poets
19th-century American poets
20th-century American poets
20th-century American male writers
20th-century American non-fiction writers
American male non-fiction writers